Mortimer Michael "Mike" Miller (July 17, 1929 – February 11, 2017) was an American writer and politician.

Early life and education 
Born in Trinidad, Colorado, Miller received his bachelor's degree in journalism from Wichita State University.

Career 
In 1954, Miller moved to Ketchikan, Alaska. Miller worked for Alaska Sportsmen magazine (now Alaska). In 1960, Miller and his family moved to Juneau, Alaska, and he was worked as the publicity director for the Alaska Division of Tourism. Miller also wrote several books and articles. Miller served on the Juneau City and Borough Assembly as a Democrat. From 1971 to 1987, Miller served in the Alaska House of Representatives. From 1987 to 1992 and from 1997 to 2002, Miller served on the Alaska Department of Corrections Parole Board.

Death 
Miller died from pneumonia in Vancouver, Washington.

Notes

1929 births
2017 deaths
Politicians from Juneau, Alaska
People from Trinidad, Colorado
Wichita State University alumni
Writers from Alaska
Writers from Colorado
Borough assembly members in Alaska
Democratic Party members of the Alaska House of Representatives